Bolhuis is a Dutch surname. Notable people with the surname include:

 André Bolhuis (born 1946), Dutch field hockey player
 Gerrit Bolhuis (1907–1975), Dutch sculptor
 Peter Bolhuis (born 1954), Dutch actor

Dutch-language surnames